Carlos Ramírez (born 16 April 1970) is a Salvadoran judoka. He competed in the men's half-lightweight event at the 1996 Summer Olympics.

References

1970 births
Living people
Salvadoran male judoka
Olympic judoka of El Salvador
Judoka at the 1996 Summer Olympics
Place of birth missing (living people)